Angarotipula is a genus of true crane fly.

Distribution
China, India, Canada, United States, Russia, Finland, Norway, Sweden, Mongolia.

Species
A. altivolans (Alexander, 1935)
A. frommeri (Alexander, 1966)
A. heilongjiangana Yang & Yang, 1995
A. illustris (Doane, 1901)
A. indica (Edwards, 1926)
A. laetipennis (Alexander, 1935)
A. parrioides (Alexander, 1919)
A. qinghaiensis Yang & Yang, 1996
A. rubzovi (Savchenko, 1961)
A. snodgrassiana (Alexander, 1966)
A. tokunagana (Alexander, 1964)
A. tumidicornis (Lundstrom, 1907)
A. xuthoptera (Alexander, 1966)

References

Tipulidae
Tipuloidea genera